The Soviet 160 mm Mortar M1943 is a smoothbore breech loading heavy mortar which fired a 160 mm bomb. The M1943 (also called the MT-13) was one of the heaviest mortar used by Soviet troops in World War II. Around 535 of these weapons were fielded with Soviet forces during the war. It was replaced in Soviet service after World War II by the M-160 mortar of the same caliber.

Description
Originally a simple scaling-up of the 120 mm M1938 mortar, it soon became apparent that drop-loading a 40 kg bomb into a 3 meter high tube would be too difficult for any man to do. It was redesigned into a breech loading weapon, and contains a substantial recoil system to soak up the massive shock of firing a 160 mm bomb and prevent the baseplate from burying itself too deeply.

The barrel sits in a cradle which is attached to a baseplate and tripod. To load the weapon, the barrel is hinged forward which exposes the rear end of the tube. The bomb is then loaded, retained in place by a catch, and the barrel is swung back into the cradle, which in effect closes the breech.

Because of the weight of the mortar, it is equipped with wheels and is designed to be towed by a motor-driven vehicle.

Service

Users

 : 60 
: 30

Former users

References

 Hogg, Ian (2000). Twentieth-Century Artillery. Friedman/Fairfax Publishers. 
 Hogg, Ian (editor) (1984). Jane's Infantry Weapons. Janes Publishing Limited. .
 Zaloga, Stephen and Ness, Leland. Red Army Handbook 1939-1945. Sutton Publishing. .

External links 

 https://web.archive.org/web/20080315123137/http://www.weaponblog.ru/group/vidy/voennaja_texnika/39451.html

World War II mortars of the Soviet Union
160 mm mortars
Weapons and ammunition introduced in 1943